Ghargħur Football Club is a football club from the small village of Għargħur in north-western Malta. Gharghur currently competes in the Maltese National Amateur League.

Current squad

External links
Official website 
Fan website

Association football clubs established in 1944
Football clubs in Malta
1944 establishments in Malta
Għargħur